Medemblik Regatta, formerly known as the Delta Lloyd Regatta, is an annual sailing regatta in Medemblik, the Netherlands. It hosts the Olympic and Paralympic classes.

It is part of the 2015 EUROSAF Champions Sailing Cup.

Winners

Men's 470

2015 –  Johan Molund & Sebastian Östling

Women's 470

2015 –  Sophie Weguelin & Eilidh McIntyre

Open 470

2017 –  Pavel Sozykin & Denis Gribanov|

Men's 49er

2015 –  Diego Botin & Iago López
2017 –  Tim Fischer & Fabian Graf

Women's 49er FX

2015 –  Annemiek Bekkering & Annette Duetz
2017 –  Enia Ninčević & Peiar Cupac

Men's Finn

2015 –  Pieter-Jan Postma

Men's Laser

2015 –  Matthew Wearn
2017 –  Elliot Hanson

Women's Laser Radial

2015 –  Marit Bouwmeester
2017 –  Manami Doi

Mixed Nacra 17

2015 –  Lin Ea Cenholt & Christian Peter Lübeck

Men's RS:X

2015 –  Paweł Tarnowski
2017 –  Dorian van Rijsselberghe

Women's RS:X

2015 –  Maja Dziarnowska

2.4 Metre

2015 –  Damien Seguin
2017 –  Megan Pascoe

Optimist

2015 –  Jelmer Velds

SKUD 18

2015 –  Daniel Fitzgibbon & Liesl Tesch

Sonar

2015 –  Colin Harrison, Jonathan Harris & Russell Boaden

References

Annual sporting events in the Netherlands
Sailing competitions in the Netherlands
Sailing regattas
Sailing World Cup
EUROSAF Champions Sailing Cup
Sports competitions in North Holland
Sport in Medemblik